Melian may refer to:

 an adjectival formation of Milos or Melos, a city in Greece
 The Melian Dialogue, Athenian historian Thucydides’ dramatization of negotiations to resolve the Siege of Melos
Melian (Middle-earth), a character in J. R. R. Tolkien’s legendarium
Méliane, a character in Tyr et Sidon, ou les funestes amours de Belcar et Méliane by Jean de Schelandre
Melian Stokes, a character in Pugs and Peacocks by Gilbert Cannan

People with "Melian" or "Melián" as last name
Alberto Melián (born 1990), Argentinian boxer
Daniel Sarmiento Melián (born 1983), Spanish handball player
Diego Melián (born 1991), Uruguayan footballer
Elena Melián (born 2001), Spanish swimmer
Francisco Núñez Melián (died 1644), Spanish adventurer and administrator
Jackson Melián (born 1980), Venezuelan baseball player
José Antonio Melián (1784–1857), Argentinian colonel
Juan Carlos Melian, member of Vital Information jazz group
Michaela Melián, a member of FSK (band)

People with "Melian" or "Melián" as first or middle name
Luis Melián Lafinur (1850–1939), a Uruguayan politician
Florence Stawell (middle name Melian) (1869–1936), an Australian classical scholar

See also 
 
 Melia (disambiguation)
 Meilan (disambiguation)